Vert-Galant is an RER station in Villepinte, Seine-Saint-Denis, a northeastern suburb of Paris. It is on RER B between Villeparisis – Mitry-le-Neuf and Sevran–Livry.

References

Railway stations in Seine-Saint-Denis
Réseau Express Régional stations